A Latimer diagram of a chemical element is a summary of the standard electrode potential data of that element. This type of diagram is named after Wendell Mitchell Latimer, an American chemist.

Construction

In a Latimer diagram, the most highly oxidized form of the element is on the left, with successively lower oxidation states to the right. The species are connected by arrows, and the numerical value of the standard potential (in volts) for the reduction is written at each arrow. For example, for oxygen, the species would be in the order O2 (0), H2O2 (–1), H2O (-2):

The arrow between O2 and H2O2 has a value +0.68 V over it, it indicates that the standard electrode potential for the reaction:

O2(g) + 2H+ + 2e− ⇄ H2O2(aq)

is 0.68 volts.

Application

Latimer diagrams can be used in the construction of Frost diagrams, as a concise summary of the standard electrode potentials relative to the element. Since ΔrGo = -nFEo, the electrode potential is a representation of the Gibbs energy change for the given reduction. The sum of the Gibbs energy changes for subsequent reductions (e.g. from O2 to H2O2, then from H2O2 to H2O) is the same as the Gibbs energy change for the overall reduction (i.e. from O2 to H2O), in accordance with Hess's law. This can be used to find the electrode potential for non-adjacent steps, which gives all the information necessary for the Frost diagram.

A simple examination of a Latimer diagram can also indicate if a species will disproportionate in solution under the conditions for which the electrode potentials are given: if the potential to the right of the species is higher than the potential on the left, it will disproportionate. Therefore, hydrogen peroxide is unstable and will disproportionate (see diagram above).

See also
 Frost diagram
 Pourbaix diagram
 Ellingham diagram

References

Electrochemistry
Potentials